Evan Sinton, better known by his stage name Maala (also stylised as MAALA), is a New Zealand singer-songwriter. He is best known for his songs "Touch" and "Kind of Love", and for coming third on the second series of New Zealand's Got Talent in 2012. In 2016, he won Best Male Solo Artist at the New Zealand Music Awards.

New Zealand's Got Talent 

In 2012, under his birth name, Evan Sinton auditioned for series two of New Zealand's Got Talent with The Beatles' "Blackbird". Sinton qualified for the semi-final, with judge Jason Kerrison praising his voice, saying "it's distinctive, it's unique".

In the semi-final, Sinton performed Screamin' Jay Hawkins's song "I Put a Spell on You". Sinton placed in the top three in the semi-final, and made it to the final on the judges' vote. In the final, Sinton performed the Cher song "Bang Bang (My Baby Shot Me Down)". He finished third from the public vote.

Solo career 

In 2013, following his appearance on New Zealand's Got Talent, Sinton was signed to Sony Music New Zealand. He supported The X Factor Australia winner Reece Mastin on his 2013 New Zealand tour. Sinton went on to release the EP Phosphenes, from which came the singles "Tables and Chairs" and "Prisoner's Cinema".

MAALA 

In 2015, Sinton adopted the stage name MAALA. He used the name to separate himself from his New Zealand's Got Talent identity and to reflect the new direction of his music. He chose the name MAALA because it "looked cool on paper".

MAALA initially released the singles "Touch" and "In the AIr", followed by a self-titled EP. In July 2015, "Touch" was long-listed for the 2015 Silver Scroll award, credited to Sinton and the song's co-writers Jaden Parkes and Josh Fountain.

In 2016, the single "Kind of Love" was released, followed by MAALA's debut album, Composure. Later in 2016, MAALA was nominated for four New Zealand Music Awards, and won Best Male Solo Artist.

Discography

Albums

Singles

Notes

Awards and nominations 

!scope="col"| 
|-
| align="center" | 2015
| Evan Sinton/Jaden Parkes/Josh Fountain – "Touch"
| APRA Silver Scroll
| 
| align="center" | 
|-
| align="center" rowspan="5" | 2016
| MAALA
| MTV Europe Music Awards – Best New Zealand Act
| 
| align="center" | 
|-
| "Kind of Love"
| New Zealand Music Awards – Single of the Year
| 
| align="center" rowspan="4" | 
|-
| MAALA (Composure)
| New Zealand Music Awards – Best Male Solo Artist
| 
|-
| Composure
| New Zealand Music Awards – Best Pop Album
| 
|-
| MAALA
| New Zealand Music Awards – People's Choice Award
| 
|-
|}

References

External links 

 Official website
 Facebook page
 Soundcloud page
 YouTube channel

21st-century New Zealand male singers
New Zealand male singer-songwriters
New Zealand pop singers
Musicians from Auckland
Got Talent contestants
Living people
Year of birth missing (living people)
Sony Music New Zealand artists